Christopher O'Shea (1936 - 30 July 2016) was an Irish hurler who played for Cork Championship club St Vincent's. He was a member of the Cork senior hurling team between 1955 and 1957, during which time he usually lined out as a left wing-forward.

Honours

Cork
Munster Senior Hurling Championship (1): 1956
All-Ireland Junior Hurling Championship (1): 1955
Munster Junior Hurling Championship (1): 1955

References

1936 births
2016 deaths
St Vincent's (Cork) hurlers
Cork inter-county hurlers